The Cal 9.2 is an American sailboat that was designed by Ron Holland as an International Offshore Rule Half Ton class racer and first built in 1981.

The Cal 9.2 is a development of the Holland 1/2 Ton racer, which was originally built by Jeanneau, in Europe as the Rush 31. The design was licensed to Cal Yachts by Jeanneau and was also built in Brazil by Mariner Construções Náuticas Ltd as the Mariner 31.

Production
The design was built by Cal Yachts in the United States between 1981 and 1984, but it is now out of production.

Design
The Cal 9.2 is a recreational keelboat, built predominantly of fiberglass, with a painted aluminum mast. It has a masthead sloop rig, a raked stem, a raised reverse transom, an internally mounted spade-type rudder controlled by a tiller and a fixed fin keel. It displaces  and carries  of ballast.

The galley is located on the port side at the foot of the companionway steps and includes a two-burner alcohol stove. The head is located just aft of the "V"-berth. Additional sleeping accommodation in the main cabin includes a quarter-berth and two settees, with a drop-leaf table in between them. Ventilation is provided by two translucent hatches, one in the forward cabin and one in the main cabin, plus one ventilator. An anchor locker is in the bow.

The design includes four internal halyards, plus two internal reefing lines and an internal outhaul, plus a topping lift. There is an adjustable backstay, a boom vang and a Cunningham.

Operational history
Reviewer Richard Sherwood, wrote, "After the many Cals designed by William Lapworth, this Cal is
one of a new type called 'CalMeter Editions'. The series is intended to be high performance. The hull is a descendent of the Holland Half Tonner. The boat is made with two keels — deep and deeper."

Variants
Cal 9.2
Cal 9.2 R

See also
List of sailing boat types

Similar sailboats
C&C 1/2 Ton
C&C 30
C&C Mega 30 One Design
Catalina 30
CS 30
Hunter 30
Hunter 30T
Hunter 30-2
J/30
Kirby 30
Leigh 30
Mirage 30
Mirage 30 SX
S2 9.2
Southern Cross 28
Tanzer 31

References

Keelboats
1980s sailboat type designs
Sailing yachts
Sailboat type designs by Ron Holland
Sailboat types built by Cal Yachts